The women's discus throw at the 2006 European Athletics Championships were held at the Ullevi on August 8 and August 10.

Medalists

Schedule

Results

Qualification
Qualification: Qualifying Performance 61.00 (Q) or at least 12 best performers (q) advance to the final.

Final

External links
Results

Discus throw
Discus throw at the European Athletics Championships
2006 in women's athletics